Battle of Babylon was fought between the forces of Sassanid Empire and Rashidun Caliphate in 636. Muslim Arabs won the encounter to maintain their pursuit of conquering Ctesiphon.

Prelude
After a Muslim victory in the Battle of al-Qādisiyyah, the Caliph Umar ruled that it was time to conquer the Sasanian Empire's capital of Ctesiphon. Zuhra ibn Al-Hawiyya's military body left in advance and occupied Najaf, where he expected the rest of the troops to reach him. Then he crossed the Euphrates and proceeded along the road to Ctesiphon. He waited in Burs, after the victorious Battle of Burs, at the right bank of the Euphrates for the bulk of the Muslim troops to reach him. The next step was Babylon, on the opposite bank of the Euphrates, a fortified city where it was known there was a large concentration of Sassanian forces. Babylon was strategically important and the access key for Sawad, the territory between the Tigris and the Euphrates.

Battle
By mid-December of 636, Muslims gained the Euphrates and camped outside Babylon. The Sassanian forces in Babylon are said to have been commanded by Piruz Khosrow, Hormuzan, Mihran Razi and Nakhiragan. Whatever the reason, it is in fact that the Sassanids were unable to oppose a significant resistance to the Muslims. Hormuzan withdrew with his forces to his province of Ahwaz, after which the other Persian generals returned their units and retreated to the north.

Aftermath
After the withdrawal of Sassanian forces, citizens of Babylon formally surrendered. They were granted protection to the unusual condition of jizya's payment. Some collaborated with the victorious Muslims against the Sassanids and provided valuable information on the disposition of Persian forces. Some Babylon engineers are said to have been employed for the construction of roads and bridges. While the bulk of the Muslims stationed at Babylon, Zuhra received from Sa`d ibn Abī Waqqās the order of chasing the Sassanids who had withdrawn from the city before they could concentrate somewhere else and oppose a new resistance.

References

Battles involving the Sasanian Empire
Battles involving the Rashidun Caliphate
Muslim conquest of Mesopotamia
Military history of Iraq
636